Trivellona dolini is a species of small sea snail, a marine gastropod mollusk in the family Triviidae, the false cowries or trivias.

Description
The length of the shell attains 6 mm.

Distribution
This species occurs off the Philippines, New Caledonia and in the East China Sea.

References

 Fehse D. & Grego J. (2004) Contribution to the knowledge of the Triviidae (Mollusca: Gastropoda). IX. Revision of the genus Trivellona. Berlin and Banska Bystrica. Pubished as a CD in 2004; as a book in 2009.

Triviidae
Gastropods described in 2004